Huseby skole is a former metro station on the Røa Line of the Oslo Metro.

The station was located between Hovseter and Røa, and was opened when the Røa Line was created, as an extension from Smestad to Røa on 24 January 1935. It was closed as a part of the Røa Line overhaul in 1995.

References

Oslo Metro stations in Oslo
Railway stations opened in 1935
Railway stations closed in 1995
Disused Oslo Metro stations
1935 establishments in Norway
1995 disestablishments in Norway